Pieter Waller (5 January 1869 – 19 June 1938) was a Dutch sports shooter. He competed in the team clay pigeon event at the 1920 Summer Olympics.

References

External links
 

1869 births
1938 deaths
Dutch male sport shooters
Olympic shooters of the Netherlands
Shooters at the 1920 Summer Olympics
Sportspeople from Amsterdam